Romanian may refer to:

anything of, from, or related to the country and nation of Romania
Romanians, an ethnic group
Romanian language, a Romance language
Romanian dialects, variants of the Romanian language
Romanian cuisine, traditional foods
Romanian folklore
Romanian (stage), a stage in the Paratethys stratigraphy of Central and Eastern Europe
The Romanian newspaper
The Romanian: Story of an Obsession, a 2004 novel by Bruce Benderson

Language and nationality disambiguation pages